Naomi Van Den Broeck (born 3 January 1996) is a Belgian sprinter. She represented Belgium at the 2020 Summer Olympics in Tokyo 2021, competing in women's 4 × 400 metres relay.

References

External links
 

 

1996 births
Living people
Belgian female sprinters
Athletes (track and field) at the 2020 Summer Olympics
Olympic athletes of Belgium
20th-century Belgian women
21st-century Belgian women